Principals of the University of Edinburgh

 1586 Robert Rollock (Regent from 1583 to 1586)
 1599 Henry Charteris
 1620 Patrick Sands
 1622 Robert Boyd
 1623 John Adamson (died in office in 1652 but the original successor, William Colvill, unable to take the position until 1662)
 1653 Robert Leighton
 1662 William Colvill
 1675 Andrew Cant
 1685 Alexander Monro
 1690 Gilbert Rule
 1703 William Carstares
 1716 William Wishart (primus)
 1730 William Hamilton
 1732 James Smith
 1736 William Wishart (secundus)
 1754 John Gowdie
 1762 William Robertson
 1793 George Husband Baird
 1840 John Lee
 1859 David Brewster
 1868 Alexander Grant
 1885 William Muir
 1903 William Turner
 1916 Alfred Ewing
 1929 Thomas Henry Holland
 1944 John Fraser
 1948 Edward Victor Appleton
 1965 Michael Swann
 1974 Hugh Robson
 1979 John Harrison Burnett
 1987 David Smith
 1994 Stewart Sutherland
 2002 Timothy O'Shea
 2018 Peter Mathieson

External links
 University website

Principals
Edinburgh
Edinburgh